Herbert Lee Herring (July 22, 1891 – April 22, 1964) was a pitcher in Major League Baseball. He played for the Washington Senators.

References

External links

1891 births
1964 deaths
Major League Baseball pitchers
Washington Senators (1901–1960) players
Baseball players from Arkansas
People from Danville, Arkansas